The Gsür is a mountain in the Bernese Alps at the very southeastern end of the Diemtigtal and rising above Adelboden in the Entschligetal in the canton of canton of Bern.

Impressions

References

External links
Gsür on Hikr

Mountains of the Alps
Mountains of Switzerland
Mountains of the canton of Bern
Two-thousanders of Switzerland